Mister Eleven is a 2009 two-part British romantic drama television miniseries starring Michelle Ryan and Sean Maguire. It also stars Adam Garcia, Lynda Bellingham, Olivia Colman and Denis Lawson.  It is written by Shameless writer Amanda Coe.

Mister Eleven was released on DVD on 1 February 2010 by IMC Vision.

Cast
Michelle Ryan - Saz Paley, a new wife who cheats on her husband after reading that the happiest brides marry their eleventh sexual partner 
Sean Maguire - Dan Paley, Saz's new husband and "Mister Ten", who takes Saz back at the end of the miniseries 
Adam Garcia - Alex, Saz' "Mister Eleven" 
Denis Lawson - Len 
Lynda Bellingham - Shirley 
Olivia Colman - Beth 
Jocelyn Osorio - Alicia 
Sarah Niles - Audrey 
Nitzan Sharron - Omar 
Preeya Kalidas - Leanne 
Nicholas Burns - Eddie 
Adrianna Bertola - Young Saz 
Dev Patel - Waiter
Eliza Elkington - Missy 
Norman Bowman - Rob

References

External links
 

2009 British television series debuts
2009 British television series endings
2000s British comedy-drama television series
2000s British television miniseries
ITV television dramas
Television series by Endemol
Television series by Tiger Aspect Productions
English-language television shows
Television shows set in the United Kingdom